Fargo is an unincorporated community in Greenfield Township, Orange County, in the U.S. state of Indiana.

History
An old variant name of the community was called Pittsburgh. The community's original name is probably for the local Pitman family.

A post office was established under the name Fargo in 1888, and remained in operation until it was discontinued in 1928.

Geography

References

Unincorporated communities in Orange County, Indiana
Unincorporated communities in Indiana